The Aztec Suite is an album by trumpeter Art Farmer featuring performances arranged by Chico O'Farrill recorded in 1959 and originally released on the United Artists label.

Reception
The Allmusic review stated: "In spite of the assurances of the uncredited liner notes author who states that "since its introduction, it has become a jazz classic," this suite sounds uneven and rather dated".

Track listing
 "The Aztec Suite" (Chico O'Farrill) - 16:24    
 "Heat Wave" (Irving Berlin) - 3:35    
 "Deliro" (Felipe Domínguez) - 2:50    
 "Woody 'N You" (Dizzy Gillespie) - 3:14    
 "Drume Negrita" (Eliseo Grenet) - 3:07    
 "Alone Together" (Howard Dietz, Arthur Schwartz) - 4:21

Personnel
Art Farmer, Bernie Glow, Nick Travis - trumpet
Jimmy Cleveland, Frank Rehak - trombone
Jim Buffington - French horn
Zoot Sims, Seldon Powell - tenor saxophone
Hank Jones - piano
Addison Farmer - bass
Charlie Persip - drums
José Mangual - percussion
Chico O'Farrill - arranger

References 

United Artists Records albums
Art Farmer albums
1959 albums
Albums arranged by Chico O'Farrill